Khadakwadi is a village in Parner taluka in Ahmednagar district of state of Maharashtra, India.

Demographics 
The Khadakwadi village had population of 3135 of which 1580 are males while 1555 are females as per Population Census 2011

See also
 Villages in Ambegao taluka

References 

Villages in Parner taluka